The stone sculptures of Southern Dynasties mausoleums are several groups of stone sculptures in Jiangsu Province, southeast China. 

The stone sculptures are located in four areas: Nanjing, Jiangning, Danyang, and Jurong. They are Major National Historical and Cultural Sites in Jiangsu. The mausoleums of the Six Dynasties period of the Southern Dynasties cover areas in Nanjing.

Sculptures
These stone sculptures were first created in the Liu Song dynasty periods of the Southern Dynasties, about 1,500 years ago.

The vivid and elegant stone sculptures consist of: the Chinese unicorn (Qilin), Tianlu (a Chinese legendary animal), Bixie, stone columns, steles, and winged animals. They are the treasures of ancient stone art that reflect the cultural exchanges among China, Ancient Greece, and Ancient Persia.

A stone sculpture depicting Bixie is used as the city of Nanjing's icon.

See also
Major national historical and cultural sites (Jiangsu)
Sculptures in China

References

Stone sculptures in China
Northern and Southern dynasties
Major National Historical and Cultural Sites in Jiangsu
Tourist attractions in Nanjing